Dilip Choudhary is an Indian politician from Rajasthan. 
He was elected as M.L.A. from Jaitaran constituency in the 2008 Rajasthan Legislative Assembly election, on an independent ticket. He was a former parliamentary secretary of the Rajasthan Government.

References

External links 

Indian politicians
Living people
Year of birth missing (living people)
Rajasthan MLAs 2008–2013
Indian National Congress politicians from Rajasthan